Stenomelania crenulata is a species of brackish and freshwater snail, an aquatic gastropod mollusk in the family Thiaridae.

Distribution 
This is considered to be a vulnerable species (VU) in Japan.

References

External links 
 Hidaka H. & Kano Y. (2014). "Morphological and genetic variation between the Japanese populations of the amphidromous snail Stenomelania crenulata (Cerithioidea: Thiaridae). Zoological Science 31(9): 593-602. .

Thiaridae
Gastropods described in 1838